The mottle-breasted honeyeater (Microptilotis mimikae), also known as the spot-breasted meliphaga, is a species of bird in the family Meliphagidae. It is found throughout New Guinea. Its natural habitats are subtropical or tropical moist lowland forests and subtropical or tropical moist montane forests.

References

mottle-breasted honeyeater
Birds of New Guinea
mottle-breasted honeyeater
Taxonomy articles created by Polbot